The 2006 Darwin Triple Crown (commercially known as the 2006 Skycity Triple Crown) was a motor race for V8 Supercars held on the weekend of 30 June–2 July 2006. The event was held at the Hidden Valley Raceway in Darwin, Northern Territory, and consisted of three races culminating in 373 kilometres. It was the fifth round of thirteen in the 2006 V8 Supercar Championship Series.

Background
Tony Ricciardello and José Fernández continued their ride-share agreement at Britek Motorsport, with the Western Australian driver taking the reins for the round. Over at Paul Morris Motorsport, Fabian Coulthard was replaced with Steven Ellery to give the former Triple 8 and Holden Young Lions driver some miles before joining Paul Morris for the Endurance rounds.

Results

Qualifying

Top Ten Shootout

Race 1

Race 2

Race 3

Round standings

Championship standings

References

Darwin
Sport in Darwin, Northern Territory
2000s in the Northern Territory
Motorsport in the Northern Territory